This is a list of notable events in music that took place in the year 1958.

Specific locations
1958 in British music
1958 in Norwegian music

Specific genres
1958 in country music
1958 in jazz

Events
 January – Maria Callas, due to open the Rome Opera House season with Norma with Italy's president, Giovanni Gronchi, in the audience, cancels after the first act because of voice problems.
 January 24 – Paul McCartney makes his first appearance at The Cavern Club in Liverpool with The Quarrymen.
 February – 45,000 people in one week watch performances of "rokabirī" music by Japanese singers at the first Nichigeki Western Carnival.
 February 14 – The Iranian government bans rock & roll, claiming that this form of music is against the concepts of Islam and is a health hazard. Iranian doctors warn of the risk of injuries to the hips from the "extreme gyrations" of rock & roll dances.
 February 19
  An American singer-songwriter Carl Perkins left Sun Records and moved to Columbia Records 
 Motown released its first record Got a Job (Smokey Robinson and The Miracles)
 March 5 – Guitarist Andrés Segovia premieres Fantasía para un gentilhombre (Fantasia for a Gentleman) by composer Joaquín Rodrigo at the San Francisco Symphony conducted by Enrique Jordá.
 March 12
 Billie Holiday is given a year's probation by a Philadelphia court following her arrest and guilty plea on narcotics possession charges in 1956.
 In Hilversum, Netherlands, "Dors, mon amour" sung by André Claveau (music by Pierre Delanoë, text by Hubert Giraud) wins the third annual Eurovision Song Contest for France. Domenico Modugno places third for Italy with "Nel blu, dipinto di blu" which, retitled "Volare", will reach No. 1 in the US Billboard Hot 100, and will win two Grammy Awards next year for Record of the Year and Song of the Year for 1958.
 March 24 – Elvis Presley enters the U.S. Army.
 April 10 – Cleo Laine marries John Dankworth.
 May 30 – Béla Bartók's Violin Concerto No. 1 is premiered in Basel, 50 years after it was composed
 c. July 12 – The Quarrymen (Paul McCartney, John Lennon (lead vocals), George Harrison, Colin Hanton (drums) and John Lowe (piano)) record a single 78 rpm shellac acetate disc at Phillips' Sound Recording Services in Liverpool: "In Spite of All the Danger" (McCartney–Harrison) and a cover of Buddy Holly's "That'll Be the Day".
 August 4 – Billboard magazine launches its "Hot 100" singles chart, with Ricky Nelson's "Poor Little Fool" as the #1 record.
 September 24 – Italian singers Natalino Otto and Flo Sandon's scout the young, talented Mina
 The Festival dei Due Mondi is founded by Gian Carlo Menotti.
 Marvin Gaye begins recording with his first group.
 Otis Williams & the Distants begin their musical career. They will later join with The Primes and become The Temptations.
 Phil Spector begins his recording career.
 Dalida receives the Music Hall "Bravos" along with Yves Montand.
 RCA introduces its first stereo LPs.
 The major record labels begin to cease production of 78 rpm records.
 Kenny Rogers signs his first recording contract with a major record label and makes his first national TV performance on American Bandstand.
 Fred Foster opens Monument Records in Hendersonville, Tennessee.
 Ernesto Bonino leaves the US and returns to Italy.
 Bob Bogle and Don Wilson founds the surf instrumental group The Ventures.
 The Country Music Association (CMA) is founded as the first trade association dedicated to a single music genre.
 Singer Júnior joins the pioneering Spanish electric guitar group Jump.

Albums released
 Anita Sings the Winners – Anita O'Day
 Around the World – Bing Crosby
 As Long As There's Music – Eddie Fisher
 Ascenseur pour l'échafaud (soundtrack) – Miles Davis
 The Atomic Mr. Basie – Count Basie
 Bo Diddley – Bo Diddley
 Buddy Holly – Buddy Holly
 Breezin' Along – The Four Lads
 C'est ça – Charles Aznavour
 Chicago Musette – John Serry and His Accordion – John Serry Sr. 
 Cole Español – Nat King Cole
 Come Fly with Me – Frank Sinatra
 Destination Moon – The Ames Brothers
 Dream – The Mills Brothers
 Ella Fitzgerald and Billie Holiday at Newport – Ella Fitzgerald and Billie Holiday
 Ella Fitzgerald Sings the Irving Berlin Songbook – Ella Fitzgerald
 Ella Swings Lightly – Ella Fitzgerald
 Ellington Indigos – Duke Ellington
 Elvis' Golden Records – Elvis Presley
 The Everly Brothers – The Everly Brothers
 The Fabulous Johnny Cash – Johnny Cash
 Fancy Meeting You Here – Bing Crosby and Rosemary Clooney
 For Musicians Only – Stan Getz
 For Teenagers In Love – Teresa Brewer
 Foreign Affair – Frankie Laine and Michel LeGrand
 Frank Sinatra Sings for Only the Lonely – Frank Sinatra
 Freedom Suite – Sonny Rollins
 Give Him the Ooh-La-La – Blossom Dearie
 Gogi Grant – Welcome To My Heart – Gogi Grant
 Gondolier – Dalida
 Greatest Hits – Frankie Laine
 A Guy in Love – Guy Mitchell
 Have 'Twangy' Guitar Will Travel – Duane Eddy (debut)
 He's So Fine – Jackie Wilson
 Hooray for Hollywood – Doris Day
 John Coltrane with the Red Garland Trio – John Coltrane
 Johnny Horton Sings Free And Easy – Johnny Horton
 Johnny's Greatest Hits – Johnny Mathis
 Julie Is Her Name, Volume II – Julie London
 Kate Smith Sings Folk Songs – Kate Smith
 King Creole (OST) – Elvis Presley
 King of Suriname – Ramdew Chaitoe
 The Kingston Trio – The Kingston Trio
 Last Night When We Were Young – Art Farmer
 Les Gitans – Dalida
 London by Night – Julie London
 Milestones – Miles Davis
 The Mills Brothers In Hi-Fi – The Mills Brothers
 The Mills Brothers Sing – The Mills Brothers
 Miss Music – Teresa Brewer
 Mmmm, The Mills Brothers – The Mills Brothers
 Music! Music! Music! – Teresa Brewer
 My Happiness – Connie Francis
 No Count Sarah – Sarah Vaughan
 One Dozen Berrys – Chuck Berry
 Our Gal Sal – Sally Starr (with The Comets)
 Paris Holiday – Bing Crosby
 Rhonda – Rhonda Fleming
 Ricky Nelson – Ricky Nelson
 Rockin' Around the World – Bill Haley & His Comets
 Rockin' the Joint – Bill Haley & His Comets
 Rockin' With Kay Starr – Kay Starr
 Salut les copains – Gilbert Bécaud
 Saturday Night with Mr. C – Perry Como
 Sings the Songs That Made Him Famous – Johnny Cash
 Smoochin' Time – The Ames Brothers
 Some Pleasant Moments In The 20th Century – Oscar Levant
 Songs I Wish I Had Sung – Bing Crosby
 South Pacific – Original soundtrack
 Star Dust – Pat Boone
 Surprise Package – The Crew Cuts
 Swingin' Down Broadway – Jo Stafford
 Teresa – Teresa Brewer
 Teresa Brewer At Christmas Time – Teresa Brewer
 Them There Eyes – Kay Starr
 This Is Sinatra Volume 2 – Frank Sinatra
 'Til Morning – Johnnie Ray
 Time For Teresa – Teresa Brewer
 Torchin'  – Frankie Laine
 Tormé – Mel Tormé
 Wheelin' & Dealin' – Mal Waldron, John Coltrane and Frank Wess
 When You Come to the End of the Day – Perry Como
 Who's Sorry Now? – Connie Francis
 Yes Indeed! – Pat Boone

Biggest hit singles
The following songs achieved the highest chart positions
in the charts for the longest time in 1958, in their respective countries.

Top Hits on record

Published popular music
 "16 Candles" w.m. Luther Dixon & Allyson R. Khent
 "All I Have to Do is Dream" w.m. Felice and Boudleaux Bryant
 "Am I That Easy to Forget" w.m. Carl Belew, W. S. Stevenson & Shelby Singleton
 "Any Way The Wind Blows" w.m. William Dunham, Joseph Hooven & Marilyn Hooven
 "Are You Really Mine?" w.m. Al Hoffman, Dick Manning & Mark Markwell
 "A Big Hunk O' Love" w.m. Aaron Schroeder & Sid Wyche
 "Bird Dog" w.m. Felice and Boudleaux Bryant
 "Broken Hearted Melody" w. Hal David m. Sherman Edwards
 "A Certain Smile" w. Paul Francis Webster m. Sammy Fain
 "Chantilly Lace" w.m. Jiles Perry Richardson
 "C'mon Everybody" w.m. Eddie Cochran & Jerry Capeheart
 "Devoted to You" w.m. Felice and Boudleaux Bryant
 "Do You Want To Dance?" w.m. Bobby Freeman
 "Donna" w.m. Ritchie Valens
 "Don't" w.m. Jerry Leiber & Mike Stoller
 "Enchanted Island" w. Al Stillman m. Robert Allen
 "Everybody Loves a Lover" w. Richard Adler m. Robert Allen
 "French Foreign Legion" w. Aaron Schroeder m. Guy Wood
 "Hoots Mon" Harry Robertson
 "If I Had A Hammer" w.m. Pete Seeger & Lee Hays
 "It's Only Make Believe" w.m. Conway Twitty & Jack Nance
 "Johnny B. Goode" w.m. Chuck Berry
 "Kewpie Doll" w.m. Sid Tepper & Roy C. Bennett
 "Kumbayah" recorded by Joe Hickerson and by Pete Seeger
 "Left Right Out Of Your Heart" w. Earl Shuman m. Mort Garson
 "The Little Serenade" w.m. Antonio Amurri, Paolo Esposito, Geoffrey C. Parsons & James J. T. Phillips
 "Little Star" w.m. Vito Picone & Arthur Venosa
 "Make Me A Miracle" Al Hoffman, Dick Manning, Mark Markwell
 "Maybe Baby" w.m. Norman Petty & Charles Hardin
 "Moon Talk" w.m. Al Hoffman & Dick Manning
 "My True Love" w.m. Jack Scott
 "Oh-Oh, I'm Falling In Love Again" w.m. Al Hoffman, Dick Manning & Mark Markwell
 "Once Upon A Summertime" (Original title "La Valse des Lilas") Eddie Barclay, Michel Legrand, Eddy Marnay, Johnny Mercer
 "Only The Lonely" Sammy Cahn, James Van Heusen
 "Padre" w. (Eng) Paul Francis Webster (Fr) Marcel Algeron & Jacques Larue m. Alain C. Romans
 "Patricia" w. Bob Marcus m. Perez Prado
 "Peter Gunn" m. Henry Mancini
 "Poor Little Fool" w.m. Shari Sheeley
 "The Purple People Eater" w.m. Sheb Wooley
 "Raining In My Heart" w.m. Felice and Boudleaux Bryant
 "Rave On!" w.m. Norman Petty, Bill Tilghman & Sunny West
 "Rawhide" w. Ned Washington m. Dimitri Tiomkin. Title tune of the TV series performed by Frankie Laine.
 "Secretly" w.m. Al Hoffman, Dick Manning & Mark Markwell
 "Splish Splash" w.m. Bobby Darin & Jean Murray
 "Stupid Cupid" w. Howard Greenfield m. Neil Sedaka
 "Sugartime" w.m. Charlie Phillips & Odis Echols
 "Summertime Blues" Eddie Cochran, J. Capehart
 "Sweet Little Sixteen" w.m. Chuck Berry
 "Tears On My Pillow" w.m. Sylvester Bradford & Al Lewis
 "Tequila" w.m. Chuck Rio
 "There's Only One Of You" w. Al Stillman m. Robert Allen
 "Tom Dooley" trad arr. Dave Guard
 "Volare" w. (Eng) Mitchell Parish (Ital) Domenico Modugno & Franco Migliacci m. Domenico Modugno
 "We Belong Together", S. Weiss, Robert Carr, Johnny Mitchell
 "When" w.m. Jack Reardon & Paul Evans
 "Witch Doctor" w.m. Ross Bagdasarian
 "Yakety Yak" w.m. Jerry Leiber & Mike Stoller
 "You Are My Destiny" w.m. Paul Anka
 "Young and Warm and Wonderful" w. Hy Zaret m. Lou Singer

Other notable songs
 "The Bells of Rhymney" by Pete Seeger and Idris Davies
 "Devojko mala" w. B. Timotijević m. D. Kraljić, sung by Vlastimir "Đuza" Stojiljković in the film Ljubav i moda
 "Mera naam Chin Chin Chu" w. Qamar Jalalabadi m. O.P. Nayyar, sung by Geeta Dutt in the film Howrah Bridge
 "Pod sjajem zvezda" w. Mirjana Savić m. Predrag Ivanović
 "Majulah Singapura" by Zubir Said (national anthem of Singapore)

Classical music

Premieres

Compositions
 Jean Absil –
Burlesque, for oboe and piano, Op. 100
Danse rustique, for piano
Fantaisie concertante, for violin and orchestra, Op. 99
"Heure de grâce", for soprano (or tenor) and piano, Op. 98
Silhouettes, for flute and piano, Op. 97
 Yasushi Akutagawa – Ellora Symphony 
 William Alwyn –
Fanfare for a Joyful Occasion, for orchestra
Preludes (12), for piano
 Hendrik Andriessen –
Canzoni (3), for chorus
Liturgie Amienj Gospodie, for chorus
Missa "Fiat voluntas tua", for two voices and organ
Uilenspiegel-variatie, for two violins and orchestra
 Jurriaan Andriessen – Duo, for two violins
 Theodore Antoniou – Aquarelles, for piano
 Louis Applebaum –
Cherry Tree Carol, for SATB chorus
King Herod, for SATB chorus
 Hans Erich Apostel –
Höhe des Jahres, for four-part male chorus, Op 28
Piano Concerto, Op. 30
Studie, for flute, viola, and guitar, Op. 29
 Malcolm Arnold – Sinfonietta No. 2, for orchestra, Op. 65
 Tadeusz Baird – Four Essays
 Samuel Barber – Wondrous Love: Variations on a Shape-note Hymn, for organ, Op. 34
 Jürg Baur –
Concertante Music, for piano and orchestra
"Du selber bist das Rad", for mixed chorus
Quintetto sereno, for wind quintet
 Paul Ben-Haim – Lamenatseah mizmor (To the Chief Musician), for orchestra
 Arthur Berger – String Quartet
 William Bergsma –
Concerto, for wind quintet
Praise, for chorus and organ
 Luciano Berio – Sequenza I, for solo flute
 Lennox Berkeley –
Concerto, for piano and double string orchestra, Op. 46
Poems of W.H. Auden (5), for soprano or tenor and piano, Op. 53 
 Günter Bialas – Sonata piccola, for violin and piano
 Harrison Birtwistle – Three Sonatas for Nine Instruments (withdrawn)
 Arthur Bliss – The Lady of Shallott (ballet)
 Marc Blitzstein –
Elizabethan Songs (6), for voice and piano
 Lear: A Study, for orchestra
 Ernest Bloch – 
Suite for Viola Solo (fragmentary)
Suite No. 1 for Violin Solo
Suite No. 2 for Violin Solo
 Rob du Bois – Pieces (3), for clarinet
 André Boucourechliev – Texte I, for tape
 Pierre Boulez –
Doubles, for orchestra
Poésie pour pouvoir, for five-channel tape and three orchestral groups
Le Soleil des eaux, for soprano, tenor, bass, STB chorus, and orchestra (revised version)
 Henry Brant –
The Children's Hour, for six solo voicdes, chorus, two trumpets, two trombones, organ, and percussion 
In Praise of Learning, for 16 sopranos and 16 percussionists
Joquin, for piccolo and six instruments 
Mythical Beasts, for soprano and 16 instruments
 Benjamin Britten –
 Nocturne, for tenor, 7 obbligato instruments, and strings, Op. 60
Noye's Fludde, one-act opera, Op. 59
Sechs Hölderlin-Fragmente, for voice and piano, Op. 61
 Earle Brown – Pentathis, for flute, bass clarinet, trumpet, trombone, harp, piano, violin, viola, and cello
 Alan Bush –
Ballad of Aldermarston, for speaker, chorus, and orchestra
Ballads of the Sea (2), for piano, Op. 50
Mister Playford's Tunes, for piano, Op. 49
The World Is His Song, for baritone, chorus, and orchestra, Op. 51
 John Cage –
Aria, for solo voice
Concert, for piano and orchestra
Fontana Mix, for tape
Haiku, for any instruments
Music Walk, for piano (one or more players, also using radio and/or recordings)
Solo for Voice 1
TV Köln, for piano
Variations I, for any number of players, and any means
 Cornelius Cardew –
Books of Study for Pianists (2), for two pianos
Piano Sonata No. 3
 Julián Carrillo –
Balbuceos, for micro-tonal piano and chamber orchestra
Concerto, for -tone piano and orchestra 
 Mario Castelnuovo-Tedesco –
Endymion, for chorus, Op. 184
The Fiery Furnace (chamber cantata), for baritone, children's voicdes, piano or organ, and percussion, Op. 183
Little Songs (3), for voice and piano
Pastorale and Rondo, for clarinet, violin, cello, and piano, Op. 185 
 Niccolò Castiglioni –
Inizio di movimento, for piano
Sequenze, for orchestra
 Carlos Chávez – Invención, for piano
 Chou Wen-chung –
Soliloquy of a Bhiksuni, for trumpet, brass, and percussion 
To a Wayfarer, for clarinet, harp, percussion, and strings
 Aldo Clementi – Episode, for orchestra
 Ramiro Cortés – 
America, cycle of four songs for soprano and strings
Chamber Concerto, for cello and 12 wind instruments
 Henry Cowell –
Andrée's Birthday, for treble instrument
Birthday Piece,  for 2 treble instruments
Concerto for Percussion and Orchestra
Duet, for 2 soprano instruments
[Duet], for 2 treble instruments
Henry's Hornpipe, for treble instrument
Introduction and Allegro, for viola and harpsichord or piano
Jim's B'day, for piano
Love to Sidney, for soprano instrument and piano:Rondo for Brass, for 3 trumpets, 2 horns,  and 2 trombones
Lullaby for Philio, for treble instrument:Hymn and Fuguing Tune No. 12, for 3 horns
Wedding Rondo,  for unaccompanied clarinet
 Ingolf Dahl – Fanfares, for piano
 Luigi Dallapiccola –
Concerto per la notte di Natale dell'anno 1956, for soprano and chamber orchestra (revised version)
Requiescant, for chorus and orchestra
 Mario Davidovsky – String Quartet No. 2
 Peter Maxwell Davies –
Prolation, for orchestra
Sextet, for flute, clarinet, bass clarinet, piano, violin, and cello
 Norman Dello Joio –
O Sing unto the Lord (Psalm 48), men's voices and organ
To St Cecilia, for SATB chorus and piano or brass
 David Diamond – Wind Quintet
 Franco Donatoni – String Quartet No. 2
 Antal Doráti – The Two Enchantments of Li-Tai-Po, for baritone and chamber orchestra
 Jacob Druckman – Madrigals (4), for SATB chorus
 Vernon Duke – Variations on an Old Russian Chant, for oboe and strings
 Marcel Dupré –
Motets (2), for chorus, Op. 53
Quartet in D Minor, for organ, violin, viola, and cello, Op. 52
 John Eaton –
String Quartet
Tertullian Overture, for orchestra
 Petr Eben – Láska a smrt (Love and Death), for mixed chorus
 Helmut Eder –
Pezzo sereno, for orchestra
 Cecil Effinger –
Little Symphony No. 2
Symphony No. 5
Wind Quintet
 Gottfried von Einem –
Lieder (5), for soprano or tenor and piano,  Op. 25
Das Stundenlied, for SATB chorus and orchestra, Op. 26
 Hanns Eisler –
Am 1. Mai, for voice with small orchestra
Steht auf!, for voice and piano
 Halim El-Dabh – Clytemnestra, ballet
 Edison Denisov - Sonata for Two Violins
 Hans Ulrich Engelmann –
Noche da luna, dance pantomime
Nocturnos, for soprano and chamber orchestra
 Donald Erb –
Chamber Concerto, for piano and strings
Correlations, for piano 
Dialogue, for violin and piano
 Heimo Erbse – Ruth, ballet in two acts, Op. 16 
 Rudolf George Escher – Symphony No. 2
 Alvin Etler –
Concerto for violin and wind quintet
"Peace Be unto You", for SATB chorus
 Franco Evangelisti – Proporzioni, for flute solo
 Ferenc Farkas – Lieder (3)
 Robert Farnon –
City Streets, for orchestra
Dominion Day, for orchestra
Mr Punch, for orchestra
Rhapsody for violin and orchestra
 David Farquhar – In Despite of Death, song cycle for baritone and piano
 Samuil Feinberg – Maritza, cycle of eight songs for voice and piano, Op. 47
 Jindřich Feld – Violin Concerto
 Morton Feldman –
Ixion (Summerspace) (ballet), for ten instruments
Piano, for piano four-hands
Two Instruments, for horn and cello
 Luc Ferrari –
Étude aux accidents, for tape
Étude aux sons tendus, for tape
 Jacobo Ficher – Mi Aldea, cantata for soprano, alto, tenor, and chamber orchestra, Op. 91
 Irving Fine – Romanza, for wind quintet
 Nicolas Flagello – Serenata for orchestra, Op. 58
 Wolfgang Fortner _
Ballet blanc, for two violins and string orchestra
Berceuse royale, for soprano, violin, and string orchestra
 Lukas Foss – 
Ode, for orchestra (revised version)
Symphony of Chorales, for orchestra
 Jean Françaix –
La dame dans la lune, ballet
Divertimento, for horn and orchestra
L'homme entre deux âges, for voice, flute, and string quintet
 Benjamin Frankel – Symphony No. 1
 Alberto Ginastera –
Hay que bañar al nene (film score)
El límite (incidental music)
Primavera de la vida (film score)
String Quartet No. 2, Op. 26
 Marcel Grandjany – Fantaisie sur un thème de J. Haydn, Op. 31, for harp
 Ferde Grofé – Concerto in D, for piano and orchestra
 Alois Hába – String Quartet No. 11, Op. 87
 Paul Hindemith – 
Pittsburgh Symphony
12 Fünfstimmige Madrigale for mixed chorus
Octet for clarinet, bassoon, horn, violin, two violas, cello, and double bass
 Dmitri Kabalevsky – In the Magic Forest
 Mauricio Kagel – Anagrama, for soprano, alto, baritone, bass, speaking chorus, flute, clarinet, bass clarinet, 3 percussionists, celesta, 2 pianos, and 2 harps
 Leon Kirchner – String Quartet No. 2
 György Ligeti – Artikulation
 Witold Lutosławski – Funeral music
 Bohuslav Martinů – 
Piano Concerto No. 5, H. 366
The Parables H. 367
Estampes
Duo No. 2 for Violin and Cello
 Peter Mennin – Piano Concerto
 Darius Milhaud – String Sextet, Op. 368
 José Pablo Moncayo –
Pequeño nocturno, for piano
Symphony No. 2 (unfinished)
Tierra (ballet), for orchestra
 Thea Musgrave – String Quartet
 Luigi Nono
Cori di Didone, for chorus and percussion
Piccola gala notturna veneziana in onore dei 60 anni di Heinrich Strobel, for 14 instruments
La terra e la compagna, for soprano, tenor, chorus, and instruments
 Per Nørgård – Constellations, for strings
 Harry Partch – Windsong, film score for ensemble of original instruments
 Arvo Pärt - Partita, Op. 2 for piano
 Goffredo Petrassi –
Saluto augurale, for orchestra
Serenata, for flute, harpsichord, percussion, viola, and contrabass
String Quartet
 George Rochberg – Cheltenham Concerto, for flute, oboe, clarinet, bassoon, horn, trumpet, trombone, and strings
 Ned Rorem – Symphony No. 3
 Edmund Rubbra – Pezzo Ostinato (Rubbra collections page with description) and Violin Concerto, Opp. 102 and 103.
 Carl Ruggles – Exaltation
 Giacinto Scelsi – 
String Trio
I presagi for 11 players: 9 brass and 2 percussion
Tre canti popolari for four-voice mixed choir
Tre canti sacri for eight-voice mixed choir
 Dieter Schnebel –
für stimmen ( ... missa est): dt 31,6, for 12 vocal ensembles
Raum-Zeit Y, for instruments
 Alfred Schnittke – Oratorio Nagasaki
 Humphrey Searle – Symphony No. 2, Op. 33 (1956–8); Variations and Finale, Op. 34
 Roger Sessions –
String Quintet
Symphony No. 4
 Dmitri Shostakovich – Moskva, Cheryomushki, operetta, Op. 105
 Toru Takemitsu –
Kamitsukareta kaoyaku [A Boss Who was Bitten] (film score)
Kokusen'ya, incidental music
Pananpe no omoigakenai shōri no hanashi [The Story of Panape's Unexpected Victory], for tenor, baritone, clarinet, vibraphone, piano, guitar, and percussion
Solitude sonore, for orchestra
Sora, uma, soshite shi [Sky, Horse and Death], for tape
Tableau noir, for speaker and chamber orchestra
Yume no hoshi [A Star in a Dream] (television music)
Utau dake, for chorus
 Eduard Tubin – Symphony No. 7
 Edgard Varèse – Poème électronique (1957–58)
 Anatol Vieru –
Concerto for Flute and Orchestra
Eight Miniatures, for piano
 Heitor Villa-Lobos –
Bendita sabedoria, for six-part choir
Fantasia, for wind orchestra
Fantasia concertante, for orchestra of cellos (at least 32 instruments)
Green Mansions (film score, concert arrangement as Forest of the Amazon)
Magnificat alleluia, solo voice, chorus, and orchestra
A menina das nuvens, musical adventure in three acts
 Leó Weiner – Concerto for Violin No. 1 in D major
 Stefan Wolpe –
Dust of Sorrow, for SATB choir
The Hour Glass (dramatic scene)
The Way a Crow, for SATB choir
 Iannis Xenakis –
Analogique A, for string ensemble
Concret PH, for 2-track tape
 Bernd Alois Zimmermann –
Impromptu, for orchestra
Omnia tempus habent, canatata for soprano and 17 instruments

Opera
 Samuel Barber – Vanessa
 Carlisle Floyd – Wuthering Heights
 Jakov Gotovac – Dalmaro
 Gian Carlo Menotti – Maria Golovin
 Ildebrando Pizzetti – Assassinio nella cattedrale 
Humphrey Searle – The Diary of a Madman

Jazz

Musical theatre
 The Body Beautiful Broadway production, opened at The Broadway Theatre and ran for 60 performances
 The Boy Friend (Sandy Wilson) – off-Broadway revival
 Expresso Bongo London production
 Flower Drum Song (Richard Rodgers and Oscar Hammerstein II) Broadway production, opened at the St. James Theatre and ran for 600 performances
 Irma La Douce London production
 Lola Montez, Brisbane production opened at Her Majesty's Theatre on October 1
 Oh, Captain! Broadway production opened at the Alvin Theatre on February 4 and ran for 192 performances.
 Salad Days (Julian Slade) New York production ran for 80 performances
 Valmouth London production
 West Side Story (Leonard Bernstein) – London production
 Where's Charley? London production

Musical films
 April Love starring Pat Boone and Shirley Jones
 Damn Yankees starring Tab Hunter, Gwen Verdon and Ray Walston
 The Duke Wore Jeans British film starring Tommy Steele
 Gigi starring Leslie Caron, Louis Jourdan, Maurice Chevalier and Hermione Gingold
 King Creole starring Elvis Presley
 Mardi Gras starring Pat Boone
 Música de Siempre, featuring Édith Piaf
 Senior Prom starring Jill Corey
 South Pacific starring Mitzi Gaynor
 The Tunnel of Love

Musical television
 Aladdin (Cole Porter) televised on February 21 starring Cyril Ritchard, Basil Rathbone, Dennis King, Sal Mineo, Anna Maria Alberghetti and Una Merkel.
 Hansel and Gretel (William Engvick and Alec Wilder) televised on April 27 starring Barbara Cook and Red Buttons
 Kiss Me, Kate starring Alfred Drake, Patricia Morison, Julie Wilson, Bill Hayes and Jack Klugman

Births
 January 1 – Grandmaster Flash, rapper
 January 2 – Vladimir Ovchinnikov, Russian pianist
 January 8 – Steve Garvey, bass guitarist (Buzzcocks, The Teardrops and Bok Bok)
 January 9 – Hillevi Martinpelto, Swedish operatic soprano
 January 10 – Samira Said, Moroccan singer
 January 11
Vicki Peterson, rock guitarist and songwriter (The Bangles and Psycho Sisters)
Trevor Taylor, Jamaican-German singer and musician
 January 21 – Frank Ticheli, American composer and academic
 January 24 – Jools Holland, R&B pianist and singer, TV music presenter
 January 29 – Vlatka Oršanić, opera singer
 February 10 – Michael Weiss, jazz pianist and composer
 February 12 – Grant McLennan, Australian singer-songwriter and guitarist (The Go-Betweens and Jack Frost) (died 2006)
 February 16 – Ice-T, American musician, rapper, songwriter, actor, record executive, record producer and author 
 February 21
 Jake Burns (Stiff Little Fingers)
 Mary Chapin Carpenter, American singer-songwriter
 February 23 – David Sylvian (Japan)
 February 25 – Eva Johansson, Danish operatic soprano
 March 5 – Andy Gibb, English singer-songwriter, performer and teen idol (Bee Gees) (died 1988)
 March 8 – Gary Numan, singer  
 March 9 – Martin Fry, vocalist (ABC)
 March 10 – Frankie Ruiz, Puerto Rican singer (died 1998)
 March 28 – Edesio Alejandro, Cuban composer
 April 10
 Yefim Bronfman, Russian-born pianist
 Errollyn Wallen, Belize-born composer
 April 11 – Stuart Adamson (Big Country) (died 2001)
 April 12 – Will Sergeant (Echo & the Bunnymen)
 April 14 – Aprile Millo, American operatic soprano of Italian and Irish ancestry 
 April 18 – Les Pattinson (Echo & the Bunnymen)
 April 21 – Andranik Madadian, Armenian/Iranian singer-songwriter
 April 25 – Fish, Scottish singer (Marillion)
 May 2 – Mayumi Horikawa, Japanese singer-songwriter and model
 May 6 – Lolita Flores, Spanish actress and singer
 May 10 – Vlada Divljan, Serbian singer-songwriter and guitarist (Idoli and Apartchiks) (died 2015)
 May 12 – Eric Singer, American drummer and songwriter
 May 18 – Toyah Willcox, English singer and actress
 May 21 – Mike Barson (Madness)
 May 23 – Shelly West, American country singer
 May 25 – Paul Weller, singer-songwriter The Jam, Style Council 
 May 27 – Neil Finn, singer-songwriter, Split Enz, Crowded House
 May 30 – Marie Fredriksson, pop singer-songwriter (Roxette) (died 2019)
 June 2 – Karl Gottfried Brunotte, composer and music philosopher
 June 3 – Roger Redgate, composer-conductor
 June 7 – Prince, Prolific American singer-songwriter, multi instrumentalist, record executive, record producer, musician and film maker (died 2016)
June 12 – Meredith Brooks, American singer-songwriter and guitarist
 June 17 – Jello Biafra (Dead Kennedys)
 June 21
 Jennifer Larmore, american operatic mezzo-soprano
 Steve Lieberman punk musician (Gangsta Rabbi)
 June 24 – Kathy Troccoli, American singer and author
 June 27 
Lisa Germano, American singer-songwriter and guitarist (OP8 and Eels)
Brian Helicopter, English bass player (The Shapes, HellsBelles and Rogue Male)
Magnus Lindberg, Finnish pianist and composer
Jeffrey Lee Pierce, American singer-songwriter and guitarist (The Gun Club) (died 1996)
 June 28 – Félix Gray, French singer-songwriter
 June 29 
Jeff Coopwood, American actor and singer
Mark Radcliffe, English radio host and folk rock singer (Shirehorses and The Family Mahone)
 June 30 – Esa-Pekka Salonen, composer-conductor
 July 5 – Paul Daniel, operatic and orchestral conductor
 July 7 – Michala Petri, recorder virtuoso
 July 18 – Bent Sørensen, composer
 July 25 – Thurston Moore, rock guitarist and singer-songwriter (Sonic Youth)
 July 26 – Angela Hewitt, classical pianist
 July 27 – Kimmo Hakola, Finnish composer
 July 30 – Kate Bush, English singer-songwriter, musician, dancer and record producer
 July 31
 Bill Berry, alternative rock drummer (R.E.M.)
 Deborah Riedel, operatic soprano (died 2009)
 August 3 – Rob Buck, alternative rock guitarist and songwriter (10,000 Maniacs)
 August 6 – Randy DeBarge, soul singer and guitarist
 August 7 – Bruce Dickinson, singer (Iron Maiden)
 August 16 – Madonna, American singer-songwriter, actress, activist and businesswoman
 August 17 – Belinda Carlisle, American singer-songwriter.
 August 22
 Ian Mitchell, British pop bassist (Bay City Rollers)
 Vernon Reid, British-born rock guitarist and songwriter (Living Colour)
 August 29 – Michael Jackson, American performer, pop singer-songwriter (died 2009)
 September 3 – Radoslav Lorković, Croatian pianist and accordionist
 September 6 – Buster Bloodvessel, vocalist (Bad Manners)
 September 10 – Siobhan Fahey, Irish pop singer-songwriter (Bananarama, Shakespears Sister)
 September 13 – Paweł Przytocki, Polish conductor
 September 14 – Rachid Taha, Algerian-born singer and activist (died 2018)
 September 19
Lita Ford, English-born American rock guitarist, actress, vocalist and songwriter (The Runaways) 
Lucky Ali, singer, composer and actor
 September 22
 Andrea Bocelli, operatic tenor
 Joan Jett, American alternative rock singer-songwriter, composer, musician, record producer and occasional actress (Joan Jett & the Blackhearts)
 October 9 – Al Jourgensen, Cuban-American industrial rock singer-songwriter and producer (Ministry)
 October 10 – Tanya Tucker, country singer
 October 13 – Derri Daugherty, American alternative rock singer-songwriter, guitarist and producer (The Choir, The Lost Dogs)
 October 14 – Thomas Dolby, English rock musician
 October 20
 Ricky Byrd, rock guitarist (Joan Jett & The Blackhearts)
 Mark King, bassist and singer (Level 42)
 October 27 – Simon Le Bon, vocalist (Duran Duran)
 November 1 – Joe DeRenzo, American drummer, composer and producer
 November 10 – Frank Maudsley (A Flock of Seagulls)
 November 22 – Jason Ringenberg (Jason & the Scorchers)
 November 27 – Tetsuya Komuro, Japanese songwriter and music producer
 December 7 – Timothy Butler (The Psychedelic Furs)
 December 9 – Nick Seymour, bassist (Crowded House)
 December 11 – Nikki Sixx (Mötley Crüe)
 December 12 – Dag Ingebrigtsen, Norwegian singer-songwriter and guitarist (The Kids and TNT)
 December 14
 Mike Scott (The Waterboys)
 Spider Stacy, folk musician (The Pogues)
 December 17 – Mike Mills (R.E.M.)
 December 23 – Victoria Williams,  American folk singer-songwriter and guitarist
 December 25
Alannah Myles, Canadian singer-songwriter
Juancho Rois, Colombian vallenato accordionist and composer (died 1994)
probable – Fortuna, Brazilian singer

Deaths
 January 20 – Ataúlfo Argenta, conductor, 44 (carbon monoxide poisoning)
 February 5 – Lew Brown, lyricist, 64
 March 24 – John Harvey Gahan, violinist, songwriter and actor, 69
 March 25
 Tom Brown, jazz trombonist, 69
 Emerson Whithorne, composer and historian, 73
 March 28 – W. C. Handy, blues composer, 84
 April 1
 Břetislav Bakala, pianist, conductor and composer, 61
 Alfred Bryan, songwriter, 86
 April 2 – Tudor Davies, operatic tenor, 65
 April 10 – Chuck Willis, singer, 30 (during surgery for stomach ulcer)
 April 16 – Margaret Burke Sheridan, operatic soprano, 68
 May 20 – Irma Baltuttis, singer, 37 (suspected murder)
 June 1 – Henri Pensis, violinist, conductor and composer
 June 3
 Georges Boulanger, violinist, 65
 Maude Nugent, songwriter, 81
 June 15 – José Pablo Moncayo, Mexican percussionist and composer, 45
 June 20 – Elfriede Trötschel, operatic soprano, 44
 June 21 – Eduard Erdmann, pianist and composer, 62
 June 23 – Armas Järnefelt, composer, 88
 June 27 – Marie Sundelius, operatic soprano, 74
 July 10 – Karl Erb, operatic tenor and lieder singer, 81
 July 31
 Eugène Goossens, fils, violinist and conductor, 91
 Percy Scholes, musicologist, 81
 August 5 – Joseph Holbrooke, composer, 80
 August 14 – Gladys Presley, mother of Elvis Presley
 August 15 – Big Bill Broonzy, blues musician and composer, 60
 August 17 – Florent Schmitt, composer, 87
 August 21 – Stevan Hristić, composer, 73
 August 26 – Ralph Vaughan Williams, composer, 85
 September 20 – Yvonne Arnaud, pianist, singer and actress, 65
 September 23 – Alfred Piccaver, British-born American operatic tenor, 74
 October 13 – Alexander Veprik, composer, 59
 October 24 – Martin Shaw, composer, 83
 October 25 – Artie Matthews, ragtime composer and songwriter, 69
 October 27 – John Wooldridge, film composer, 39 (car accident)
 October 29 – Vassili Nebolsin, conductor, 60
 November 3 – Harry Revel, composer of musicals, 52
 November 26 – Tiny Bradshaw, jazz and blues musician, 53 (stroke)
 November 27 – Artur Rodziński, conductor, 66
 December 1 – Boots Mallory, dancer, 45 (chronic throat disease)
 December 8 – Julia Lee, blues singer, 56 (heart attack)
 December 11 – Paul Bazelaire, cellist, 72
 December 20 – Éva Gauthier, operatic soprano, 73
 December 29 – Doris Humphrey, dancer and choreographer, 63
 date unknown
 Samuel Antek, violinist and conductor
 John Strachan, ballad singer

Awards

Eurovision Song Contest
 Eurovision Song Contest 1958

Tchaikovsky International Piano Competition
 Van Cliburn

References 

 
20th century in music
Music by year